Ahmetler may refer to the following places in Turkey:

 Ahmetler, Ayvacık
 Ahmetler, Biga
 Ahmetler, Bolu, a village in the district of Bolu, Bolu Province
 Ahmetler, Gerede, a village in the district of Gerede, Bolu Province
 Ahmetler, Manavgat, a village in the district of Manavgat, Antalya Province
 Ahmetler, Pazaryeri, a village in the district of Pazaryeri, Bilecik Province